Calliope is the muse of epic poetry in Greek mythology.

Calliope, Kalliope or Kalliopi may also refer to:

Arts, entertainment, and media

Fictional characters
 Calliope (God of War), in the video game series God of War
 Calliope, from the webcomic Homestuck
 Calliope, from the TV series Supernatural season 10 episode "Fan Fiction"
 Calliope Juniper, in the TV series The Simpsons season 22 episode "Flaming Moe"
 Calliope Torres, Callie Torres, in the TV series Grey's Anatomy
 Calliope, one of the wicked stepsisters from the 1997 TV film adaptation of Cinderella, played by Veanne Cox
 Calliope, one of the muses from Disney's Hercules
 Calliope, from the movie The Matrix Resurrections
 Calliope Jane, the title character from an episode of the BBC series Worzel Gummidge (2019 TV series)

Music
 Calliope (music), a musical instrument
 Calliope (record label), a French record label
 Calliope (band), a Renaissance music band based in New York City
 "Calliope", an instrumental by Tom Waits from Blood Money
 "Calliope!", a song by The Veils from Nux Vomica
 Calliope: Pittsburgh Folk Music Society, an organization in Pittsburgh, Pennsylvania, U.S.

Periodicals
 Calliope, the literary magazine of the Dwight-Englewood School
 Kalliope, a student literary magazine at Pennsylvania State University

Other uses in arts, entertainment, and media
 Calliope (Sandman), a story in the 1990 collection Dream Country, from The Sandman series by Neil Gaiman
 Calliope (TV series), an animation program
 Calliope, another name for the Origins Award for outstanding work in the game industry

Military
 HMS Calliope, five ships of the Royal Navy
 T34 Calliope, a tank-mounted rocket launcher

People
 Kalliopi (martyr) (died 250), also known as Saint Calliope, a 3rd-century Eastern martyr
 Kalliope (queen) (fl. first century BC), Indo-Greek queen of Paropamisadae
 Kaliopi (born 1966), Macedonian singer
 Kalliope Amorphous (born 1978), American artist
 Kalliopi Araouzou (born 1991), Greek swimmer
 Kalliopi Kehajia (1839-1905), Greek educator and feminist
 Mori Calliope (森カリオペ), virtual YouTuber and affiliated talent of Hololive Production
 Popi Malliotaki (born 1971), born Calliope Malliotaki, Greek singer
 Kalliopi Ouzouni (born 1973), Greek shot putter
 Calliope Spanou, Greek legal academic
 Catherine Stratakis (born 1978), known as Kalliopi Stratakis in Greek, Greek-American footballer
 Calliope Tatti (1894-1978), Greek nurse
 Calliope "Callie" Thorne, American actress
 Calliope Tsoupaki (born 1963), Greek pianist and composer

Places
 Calliope, Iowa, U.S.
 Calliope Mountain, Alaska
 Calliope, Queensland, Australia
 Calliope River, a river flowing through the area
 Shire of Calliope, the former local government area which surrounded Calliope
 Calliope Dock, a historical stone drydock in Devonport, Auckland, New Zealand
 Calliope Projects, a housing project in New Orleans, Louisiana, US
 Kalliopi, Greece, a settlement on the island of Limnos

Science and technology
 Calliope (genus), a songbird genus containing species formerly included in Luscinia
 Calliope hummingbird, a hummingbird species
 Calliope mini, a single-board computer developed for educational usage at German primary schools.
 Calliope, an open source energy system model
 Project Calliope, a space project for DIY-making a picosatellite led by Sandy Antunes
 22 Kalliope, an asteroid
 , a number of steamships with this name